Aéroports de Paris S.A., also known as Paris Aéroport , formerly as Aéroports de Paris (ADP), is a company and subsidiary of Groupe ADP . It is headquartered in Charles de Gaulle Airport, Tremblay-en-France, Seine-Saint-Denis, in the Paris metropolitan area.

Background 
The creation of the brand Paris Aéroport was announced by Aéroports de Paris S.A. during the presentation of a programme called Connect 2020, and was put into effect in April 2016. This programme, which included a major overhaul of the company's branding organization, joined the 3 Parisian international airports (Orly, Le Bourget, Charles de Gaulle) under the brand Paris Aéroport,  all other airport-related subsidiaries were gathered into one institutional brand, Groupe ADP.

Description 
Some French chefs who opened their restaurants in the Parisian airports include Guy Martin (I Love Paris), Thierry Marx, Michel Rostang, Gilles Epié (Frenchy’s Bistro). From 2006 to 2015, the number of fine-dining restaurants grew from 1 to 20 in Charles de Gaulle Airport, while the number of style fashion brands grew from 6 to 20.

Paris Aéroport replaced the Air France bus shuttles from the Parisian airports to the capital with its own Le Bus Direct bus shuttles fleet and added more stop points throughout Paris.

Seeking to reduce the stress level associated with flying, Paris Aéroport launched yoga class sessions at its boarding terminals in the summer of 2016.

Evolution of traffic

See also 

 Groupe ADP
 Paris-Charles de Gaulle Airport
 Paris-Orly Airport
 Paris - Le Bourget Airport

References

External links
 Official website

Airports in Île-de-France
Charles de Gaulle Airport
Companies based in Paris
Transport in Paris
Transport companies established in 1945
1945 establishments in France